Mark William Ridgway (born 21 May 1960) is an Australian former cricketer, who played for the Tasmanian Tigers from 1993 until 2000.

Ridgway was born in Warragul, Victoria. After failing to break into the Victorian Bushrangers side, he moved to Tasmania, where he became a regular in the Tigers' line-up. A reliable fast-medium bowler, he was able to generate strong swing, particularly outswing, and made good use of the Derwent River's strong sea breezes to move the ball with good effect.

In 2012, he joined the Victorian selection committee.

References

External links

1960 births
Living people
Tasmania cricketers
Australian cricketers
Cricketers from Victoria (Australia)
People from Warragul